Neemias Esdras Barbosa Queta (born 13 July 1999) is a Portuguese professional basketball player for the Sacramento Kings of the National Basketball Association (NBA), on a two-way contract with the Stockton Kings of the NBA G League. He started playing basketball in 2009 for F.C. Barreirense and later played college basketball for the Utah State Aggies. He was selected with the 39th overall pick in the 2021 NBA draft, being the first Portuguese player ever drafted. He became the first Portuguese citizen ever to play in the NBA on December 17, 2021.

Early life and career
Queta was born in Barreiro, Portugal to Bissau-Guinean parents Mica and Djaneuba Queta. He began playing youth basketball at age 10 with F.C. Barreirense after following his older sister to a tryout. 

On 29 August 2018, Queta signed to play college basketball for the Utah State Aggies in the United States, as he had no other collegiate offers.

College career
On 19 November 2018, Queta recorded a freshman season-high 24 points, nine rebounds, and five blocks in an 80–63 win over Saint Mary's. As a freshman, he averaged 11.8 points, 8.9 rebounds and 2.4 blocks per game, earning Second Team All-Mountain West, Freshman of the Year and Defensive Player of the Year honors. He set the program single-season record with 84 blocks. He declared for the 2019 NBA draft before withdrawing and returning to college. Queta missed the first nine games of his sophomore season with a knee injury. As a sophomore, he averaged 13 points, 7.8 rebounds and 1.7 blocks per game, repeating on the Second Team All-Mountain West and All-Defensive Team.

On 17 February 2021, Queta posted a career-high 32 points and 10 rebounds in a 79–70 loss to Boise State. On 12 March, he tallied 18 points, 14 rebounds and a school-record nine blocks in a 62–50 win against Colorado State at the Mountain West tournament semifinals. In his junior season, Queta averaged 14.9 points, 10.1 rebounds, 3.3 blocks and 2.7 assists per game. He was named to the First Team All-Mountain West and Defensive Player of the Year. Queta was one of four finalists for the Naismith Defensive Player of the Year Award. He broke his own program blocks record, ranked third nationally in blocks per game, and left as Utah State's all-time leader in blocks. On 29 March, Queta declared for the 2021 NBA draft, forgoing his remaining college eligibility.

Professional career

Benfica (2017–2018) 
In the 2017–18 season, Queta played four professional games for Benfica in the Portuguese Basketball League. On 31 August 2018, he parted ways with Benfica.

Sacramento Kings (2021–present) 
Queta was selected in the second round of the 2021 NBA draft with the 39th pick by the Sacramento Kings, becoming the first Portuguese player to be drafted in the NBA. On August 8, 2021, he signed a two-way contract with Sacramento, splitting time with their NBA G League affiliate, the Stockton Kings.
On December 17, 2021, Queta made his NBA debut against the Memphis Grizzlies, grabbing five rebounds and adding an assist and a block. He entered COVID-19 protocols on December 21, but was cleared to return to the Kings on December 30. Queta made his return to the G League on January 5, 2022, recording 21 points and 12 rebounds for Stockton in a 103-80 win over the Birmingham Squadron.
On January 11, 2022, Queta became the first Portuguese player to score points in the NBA, recording 11 points and 5 rebounds in a 109–108 loss to the Cleveland Cavaliers.

Queta was named to the G League's inaugural Next Up Game for the 2022–23 season.

National team career
Queta represented Portugal at the 2017 FIBA U18 European Championship Division B in Estonia, where he averaged 10.2 points, 8.6 rebounds, and 1.2 blocks per game. He competed at the 2018 FIBA U20 European Championship Division B in Bulgaria, averaging 14.1 points, 10.3 rebounds and 2.9 blocks per game. At the 2019 FIBA U20 European Championship Division B in Portugal, Queta led the host nation to a gold medal. He averaged 14.3 points, 11 rebounds, and two blocks per game, earning all-tournament team honors. In the semifinals, he suffered a left knee injury that sidelined him from the final.

Career statistics

NBA

|-
| style="text-align:left;"| 
| style="text-align:left;"| Sacramento
| 14 || 0 || 8.6 || .447 || — || .647 || 2.2 || .4 || .1 || .6 || 3.2
|- class="sortbottom"
| style="text-align:center;" colspan="2"| Career
| 14 || 0 || 8.6 || .447 || — || .647 || 2.2 || .4 || .1 || .6 || 3.2

College

|-
| style="text-align:left;"| 2018–19
| style="text-align:left;"| Utah State
| 35 || 35 || 27.1 || .614 || .400 || .565 || 8.9 || 1.6 || .7 || 2.4 || 11.8
|-
| style="text-align:left;"| 2019–20
| style="text-align:left;"| Utah State
| 22 || 20 || 26.7 || .624 || 1.000 || .670 || 7.8 || 1.9 || .4 || 1.7 || 13.0
|-
| style="text-align:left;"| 2020–21
| style="text-align:left;"| Utah State
| 29 || 29 || 30.0 || .559 || .000 || .707 || 10.1 || 2.7 || 1.1 || 3.3 || 14.9
|- class="sortbottom"
| style="text-align:center;" colspan="2"| Career
| 86 || 84 || 28.0 || .594 || .375 || .646 || 9.0 || 2.0 || .7 || 2.5 || 13.2

References

External links
Utah State Aggies bio

1999 births
Living people
Black Portuguese sportspeople
Centers (basketball)
Sportspeople from Barreiro, Portugal
Portuguese expatriate basketball people in the United States
Portuguese men's basketball players
Portuguese people of Bissau-Guinean descent
Sacramento Kings draft picks
Sacramento Kings players
S.L. Benfica basketball players
Stockton Kings players
Utah State Aggies men's basketball players
F.C. Barreirense players